The 22641 / 42 Thiruvananthapuram–Shalimar Superfast is a Superfast train belonging to Indian Railways southern zone that runs between  (Kerala)and  (West Bengal) in India.

It operates as train number 22641from Thiruvananthapuram Central to Shalimar and as train number 22642 in the reverse direction, serving the states of Kerala, Tamil Nadu, Andhra Pradesh, Odisha, and West Bengal.

Coaches
The 22641 / 42 Thiruvananthpuram−Shalimar Express has one AC 2-tier, Six AC 3-tier, 13 sleeper class, three general unreserved & two SLR (seating with luggage rake) coaches and two high capacity parcel van coaches. It carries pantry car.

As is customary with most train services in India, coach composition may be amended at the discretion of Indian Railways depending on demand.

Service

As the average speed of the train is slightly above , as per railway rules, its fare includes a Superfast surcharge.

Routing

Traction
Later, an Howrah-based WAP-4 locomotive takes the reversed direction and pulls the train to its destination.

References

Rail transport in Howrah
Rail transport in Kerala
Rail transport in Tamil Nadu
Rail transport in Andhra Pradesh
Rail transport in Odisha
Rail transport in West Bengal
Transport in Thiruvananthapuram
Express trains in India